Predrag Stojaković (born June 9, 1977), known by his nickname Peja (Peđa, Пеђа), is a Serbian professional basketball executive and former player who was most recently the assistant general manager and director of player personnel and development of the Sacramento Kings of the National Basketball Association (NBA). He was inducted into the Greek Basket League Hall of Fame in 2022.

Standing at 6 ft 10 (2.08 m), Stojaković played mostly at the small forward position. He won the NBA Three-Point Contest two times, and was the first European-born player to win one of the All-Star Weekend competitions. Stojaković made 1,760 three-point field goals in his career which ranked 10th all-time at the point of his retirement. Stojaković currently ranks 23rd in this category.

After starting in Crvena zvezda and while playing for PAOK, Stojaković was drafted fourteenth overall by the Sacramento Kings in the 1996 NBA draft. In the NBA, he had a breakthrough season in 2000–01 following two seasons on the bench, averaging 20.4 points and 5.8 rebounds while shooting .400 from three-point range in his first season as a starter. He finished second in voting for the 2001 Most Improved Player Award. A three-time All-star and a member of the 2004 All-NBA Second Team, Stojaković enjoyed success with the Kings reaching the 2002 Western Conference Finals. He also played for the Indiana Pacers, New Orleans Hornets and Toronto Raptors.  Stojaković won an NBA Championship in 2011 as a member of the Dallas Mavericks.

Stojaković helped to lead the senior FR Yugoslavian national team to gold medals in the 2001 FIBA EuroBasket and the 2002 FIBA World Championship. Often considered to be one of the greatest European basketball players ever, Stojaković was named the Euroscar Basketball Player of the Year by the Italian sports newspaper Gazzetta dello Sport and the Mister Europa Player of the Year twice by the Italian sports magazine Superbasket. HoopsHype named Stojaković one of the 75 Greatest International Players Ever in 2021.

On December 19, 2011, he announced his retirement from playing professional basketball. On December 16, 2014, the Sacramento Kings retired his number.

Early life
Predrag "Peja" Stojaković was born into an ethnic Serb family, to parents Miodrag and Branka Stojaković, in Požega, SR Croatia, SFR Yugoslavia. The Stojakovićs hail from the Papuk mountain region. However, his family later fled to Belgrade, at the start of the Yugoslav wars. 

In 1993, at the age of 16, Stojaković moved to Thessaloniki, Greece. Stojaković's father stayed behind in his homeland, and fought in the Army of the Republic of Serbian Krajina, against the Croatian Army, until the fall of western Slavonia, in 1995, when he joined his son in Thessaloniki. Many of Stojaković's relatives now live in Serbia.

Professional career

Red Star Belgrade (1992–1993)
At 15 years of age, Stojaković joined the Crvena zvezda (Red Star Belgrade) basketball club. With Red Star, he played in 2 senior men's level seasons (1992–93 and 1993–94 seasons). With the club, he also won a FR Yugoslav national championship, in the 1992–93 season. In the 1993–94 season, he only played in the FR Yugoslav national cup tournament. With Red Star, he played in a total of 39 games, in which he scored a total of 113 points, for a scoring average of 2.9 points per game.

PAOK Thessaloniki (1993–1998)
Stojaković moved to Greece in 1993, at the age of 16, and joined the Greek League club PAOK Thessaloniki one year later.
With PAOK, he won the 1994–95 Greek Cup tournament. He also played in the European-wide secondary level FIBA European Cup (FIBA Saporta Cup)'s 1995–96 season's Final.

Stojaković scored a memorable last-second three-pointer against Olympiacos, in Piraeus, in a 1998 Greek League playoff semifinals series, which won the game for PAOK, by a score of 58–55. That victory, which ended the five-year reign of Olympiacos as Greek League champions, allowed PAOK to face Panathinaikos in the league's finals series, although the club had a disadvantage in home games, and ultimately lost the five game series (and the league's championship) 3–2. Stojaković, who was closely guarded throughout the series by his future head coach in New Orleans, Byron Scott, who was wrapping up his basketball playing career, as one of Panathinaikos' key players, did not play at his normal level.

In his final season with PAOK, Stojaković averaged 23.9 points, 4.9 rebounds, 2.5 assists, and 1.2 steals per game in the Greek League, and 20.9 points, 3.6 rebounds, and 1.5 assists per game in the European-wide top level EuroLeague's 1997–98 season.

Sacramento Kings (1998–2006)
Stojaković was selected by the Sacramento Kings in the first round (14th overall pick) of the 1996 NBA draft while playing in Greece. He continued to play there until the Kings signed him prior to the 1998–99 NBA lockout season. After two seasons on the bench with Sacramento, he had a breakthrough season in 2000–01, averaging 20.4 points and 5.8 rebounds while shooting .400 from three-point range in his first season as a starter. He finished second in voting for the 2001 Most Improved Player Award.

In 2001–02, he played in the NBA All-Star Game for the first time. His scoring average went up to 21.2 ppg, and he reached career highs in shooting percentage (.484) and three-point percentage (.416). His scoring average dropped slightly to 19.2 ppg in 2002–03, but he played again in the All-Star Game. In both seasons, he won the Three-Point Contest conducted during All-Star Weekend.

In 2003–04, Stojaković was again selected as an All-Star, and finished second in the league in scoring with a career-high 24.2 ppg. He finished fourth in MVP voting and was voted on to the All-NBA 2nd Team. He also led the NBA in free-throw percentage (.933) and three-pointers made for the season (240). In 2004–05, he missed 16 games to injury, and was somewhat hampered in several games, but still averaged 20.1 ppg. Stojaković's number 16 was retired by the Sacramento Kings on December 16, 2014.

Indiana Pacers (2006)
On January 25, 2006, Stojaković was traded to the Indiana Pacers in exchange for forward Ron Artest, ending his eight-year tenure with the Kings. However, he missed four games of their first round playoff series with the New Jersey Nets, all losses.

New Orleans Hornets (2006–2010)
During the 2006 offseason, he agreed to a deal with the then-New Orleans/Oklahoma City Hornets worth $64 million over five years. On November 14, 2006, Stojaković scored a career-high 42 points against the Charlotte Bobcats, and became the first player in NBA history to open the game with 20 straight points for his team. His strong start to the season was halted by injuries, as a result missing all but the first 13 games of the 2006–07 season.

Stojaković bounced back the following season, starting all 77 games he played in, and was a key contributor in helping the Hornets win a franchise-record 56 games, and their first ever division title. In the first two games of their second round match-up against the defending champion San Antonio Spurs, both wins, Stojaković averaged 23.5 points per game while shooting 63.7% from the three-point line. The Hornets ultimately lost to the Spurs in seven games, ending their run.

The Hornets core of Chris Paul, Tyson Chandler, David West and Stojaković would keep the Hornets in contention the following year, but injuries and the trade of Chandler forced New Orleans into a team rebuild, making the veteran Stojaković expendable.

Toronto Raptors (2010–2011)
On November 20, 2010, Stojaković was traded to the Toronto Raptors along with Jerryd Bayless in exchange for Jarrett Jack, Marcus Banks, and David Andersen.

After appearing in only two games, on January 20, 2011, Stojaković was released by the Raptors. He had missed 26 games due to a left knee injury.

Dallas Mavericks (2011)
On January 24, 2011, Stojaković signed a deal with the Dallas Mavericks. The Mavericks won the NBA championship that year, with Stojaković averaging 7.1 points per game during the Mavericks' playoff run. He scored more than 20 points in two different playoff games for the Mavericks.

On December 19, 2011, Stojaković announced his retirement, citing ongoing back and neck problems that hindered his play later in his career.

Post-playing career
In August 2015, Stojaković was appointed director of player personnel and development for the Sacramento Kings. In May 2018, Stojaković was announced as Assistant General Manager.  In this role, he is serving as General Manager for the Stockton Kings, the Kings' NBA Development League affiliate. On August 15, 2020, the Sacramento Kings announced that Stojaković had stepped down from his position of assistant general manager.

National team career
As a member of the senior FR Yugoslavia national basketball team, Stojaković earned a bronze medal at the 1999 edition of the FIBA EuroBasket, which was held in France. He also won gold medals at the 2001 FIBA EuroBasket, which was held in Turkey, and at the 2002 edition of the FIBA World Championship, which was held in Indianapolis, Indiana. He also competed at the 2000 edition of the Summer Olympic Games. Stojaković was named the MVP of the 2001 FIBA EuroBasket, and he was also named a member of the FIBA World Championship All-Tournament Team at Indianapolis, in 2002. Joining him on that All-Tournament Team were fellow NBA stars Manu Ginóbili, Dirk Nowitzki, and Yao Ming, as well as New Zealand's Pero Cameron.

Personal life
Stojaković acquired full Greek citizenship at the age of 17, while he was playing with PAOK in Greece. His name, in Greek transliteration, is Prentragk "Petza" Kinis Stogiakovits. Stojaković also speaks Greek.

He is married to Greek model Aleka Kamila. The couple has three children, including Andrej (born 2004). In 2014, the family lived in Glyfada, Greece.

Stojaković served in the Hellenic Army, a mandatory service by each male Greek citizen. He also runs the Peja Stojaković Children's Foundation, which is a charity that is designed to help improve the lives of children in the Balkan countries of Serbia, Montenegro, and Greece.

The favourite team of his family is Crvena Zvezda, for which he played professionally in 1992–1993.

NBA career statistics

Regular season

|-
| style="text-align:left;"| 
| style="text-align:left;"| Sacramento
| 48 || 1 || 21.4 || .378 || .320 || .851 || 3.0 || 1.5 || .9 || .1 || 8.4
|-
| style="text-align:left;"| 
| style="text-align:left;"| Sacramento
| 74 || 11 || 23.6 || .448 || .375 || .882 || 3.7 || 1.4 || .7 || .1 || 11.9
|-
| style="text-align:left;"| 
| style="text-align:left;"| Sacramento
| 75 || 75 || 38.7 || .470 || .400 || .856 || 5.8 || 2.2 || 1.2 || .2 || 20.4
|-
| style="text-align:left;"| 
| style="text-align:left;"| Sacramento
| 71 || 71 || 37.3 || .484 || .416 || .876 || 5.3 || 2.5 || 1.1 || .2 || 21.2
|-
| style="text-align:left;"| 
| style="text-align:left;"| Sacramento
| 72 || 72 || 34.0 || .481 || .382 || .875 || 5.5 || 2.0 || 1.0 || .1 || 19.2
|-
| style="text-align:left;"| 
| style="text-align:left;"| Sacramento
| 81 || 81 || 40.3 || .480 || .433 || style="background:#cfecec;"|.927* || 6.3 || 2.1 || 1.3 || .2 || 24.2
|-
| style="text-align:left;"| 
| style="text-align:left;"| Sacramento
| 66 || 66 || 38.4 || .444 || .402 || .920 || 4.3 || 2.1 || 1.2 || .2 || 20.1
|-
| style="text-align:left;"| 
| style="text-align:left;"| Sacramento
| 31 || 31 || 37.0 || .403 || .397 || .933 || 5.3 || 2.2 || .6 || .1 || 16.5
|-
| style="text-align:left;"| 
| style="text-align:left;"| Indiana
| 40 || 40 || 36.4 || .461 || .404 || .903 || 6.3 || 1.7 || .7 || .2 || 19.5
|-
| style="text-align:left;"| 
| style="text-align:left;"| New Orleans
| 13 || 13 || 32.7 || .423 || .405 || .816 || 4.2 || .8 || .6 || .3 || 17.8
|-
| style="text-align:left;"| 
| style="text-align:left;"| New Orleans
| 77 || 77 || 35.2 || .440 || .441 || style="background:#cfecec;"|.929* || 4.3 || 1.2 || .7 || .1 || 16.4
|-
| style="text-align:left;"| 
| style="text-align:left;"| New Orleans
| 61 || 59 || 34.2 || .399 || .378 || .894 || 4.3 || 1.2 || .9 || .0 || 13.3
|-
| style="text-align:left;"| 
| style="text-align:left;"| New Orleans
| 62 || 55 || 31.4 || .404 || .375 || .897 || 3.7 || 1.5 || .8 || .1 || 12.6
|-
| style="text-align:left;"| 
| style="text-align:left;"| New Orleans
| 6 || 0 || 14.8 || .424 || .440 || .857 || 1.0 || 1.0 || .3 || .0 || 7.5
|-
| style="text-align:left;"| 
| style="text-align:left;"| Toronto
| 2 || 0 || 11.0 || .700 || .667 || 1.000 || 1.5 || .5 || .0 || .0 || 10.0
|-
| style="text-align:left; background:#afe6ba;| †
| style="text-align:left;"| Dallas
| 25 || 13 || 20.2 || .429 || .400 || .938 || 2.6 || .9 || .4 || .1 || 8.6
|- class="sortbottom"
| style="text-align:center;" colspan="2"| Career
| 804 || 665 || 33.5 || .450 || .401 || .895 || 4.7 || 1.8 || .9 || .1 || 17.0
|- class="sortbottom"
| style="text-align:center;" colspan="2"| All-Star
| 3 || 0 || 14.7 || .364 || .385 || .000 || 2.0 || 1.0 || .3 || .0 || 7.0

Playoffs

|-
| style="text-align:left;"| 1999
| style="text-align:left;"| Sacramento
| 5 || 0 || 21.6 || .346 || .214 || 1.000 || 3.8 || .4 || .6 || .0 || 4.8
|-
| style="text-align:left;"| 2000
| style="text-align:left;"| Sacramento
| 5 || 0 || 25.8 || .400 || .462 || .667 || 3.4 || .6 || .8 || .0 || 8.8
|-
| style="text-align:left;"| 2001
| style="text-align:left;"| Sacramento
| 8 || 8 || 38.4 || .406 || .346 || .968 || 6.4 || .4 || .6 || .4 || 21.6
|-
| style="text-align:left;"| 2002
| style="text-align:left;"| Sacramento
| 10 || 7 || 33.8 || .376 || .271 || .897 || 6.3 || 1.0 || .5 || .0 || 14.8
|-
| style="text-align:left;"| 2003
| style="text-align:left;"| Sacramento
| 12 || 12 || 40.5 || .480 || .457 || .850 || 6.9 || 2.5 || .8 || .4 || 23.1
|-
| style="text-align:left;"| 2004
| style="text-align:left;"| Sacramento
| 12 || 12 || 43.1 || .384 || .315 || .897 || 7.0 || 1.5 || 1.8 || .3 || 17.5
|-
| style="text-align:left;"| 2005
| style="text-align:left;"| Sacramento
| 5 || 5 || 40.4 || .470 || .367 || .955 || 5.2 || 1.4 || .8 || .2 || 22.0
|-
| style="text-align:left;"| 2006
| style="text-align:left;"| Indiana
| 2 || 2 || 25.5 || .444 || .000 || .857 || 4.5 || 2.0 || .5 || .5 || 11.0
|-
| style="text-align:left;"| 2008
| style="text-align:left;"| New Orleans
| 12 || 12 || 37.9 || .436 || .549 || .926 || 5.4 || .5 || .5 || .1 || 14.1
|-
| style="text-align:left;"| 2009
| style="text-align:left;"| New Orleans
| 5 || 5 || 32.4 || .367 || .308 || .923 || 2.8 || .4 || .8 || .2 || 11.2
|-
| style="text-align:left; background:#afe6ba; width:3em;"| 2011†
| style="text-align:left;"| Dallas
| 19 || 0 || 18.4 || .408 || .377 || .778 || 1.7 || .4 || .6 || .1 || 7.1
|- class="sortbottom"
| style="text-align:center;" colspan="2"| Career
| 95 || 63 || 32.7 || .418 || .376 || .900 || 4.9 || 1.0 || .8 || .2 || 14.4

Awards and achievements
NBA Champion: 2011
All-NBA Team:
Second Team: 2004
3× NBA All-Star: 2002, 2003, 2004
2× NBA Three-Point Contest Champion: 2002, 2003
4th in NBA history in career free-throw percentage at .895
23rd in NBA history in 3-pointers made with 1,760
9th in NBA playoff history in free-throw percentage at .900
28th in NBA history in 3-pointers attempted with 4,392
First player in NBA history to start a game off by scoring 20 consecutive points for his team.
He and Steve Nash of Phoenix were the only players to rank in the top 25 in both free-throw and 3-point percentage during the '04–'05 and '05–'06 seasons.
Greek Cup Winner: (1995)
FIBA EuroLeague Top Scorer: 1998
Greek League MVP: 1998
Won the 2001 Euroscar, given to the best European basketball player by Italian newspaper La Gazzetta dello Sport.
Named Mister Europa Player of the Year in 2001 and 2002 by Italian weekly magazine Superbasket.
 HoopsHype's 75 Greatest International Players Ever: 2021
 Greek Basket League Hall of Fame: 2022

See also

List of National Basketball Association career 3-point scoring leaders
List of National Basketball Association season statistical leaders
List of National Basketball Association annual free throw percentage leaders
List of National Basketball Association annual three-point field goals leaders
List of European basketball players in the United States
List of Serbian NBA players

Notes

References

External links

 
 
 Predrag Stojakovic at FIBA Europe
 
 

1977 births
Living people
2002 FIBA World Championship players
Basketball players at the 2000 Summer Olympics
Croatian expatriate basketball people in Serbia
Dallas Mavericks players
Euroscar award winners
FIBA EuroBasket-winning players
FIBA World Championship-winning players
Greek expatriate basketball people in Canada
Greek expatriate basketball people in Serbia
Greek expatriate basketball people in the United States
Greek Basket League players
Greek basketball executives and administrators
Greek men's basketball players
Greek people of Serbian descent
Indiana Pacers players
KK Crvena zvezda players
National Basketball Association All-Stars
National Basketball Association players from Croatia
National Basketball Association players from Serbia
National Basketball Association players with retired numbers
Naturalized citizens of Greece
New Orleans Hornets players
Olympic basketball players of Yugoslavia
P.A.O.K. BC players
People from Požega, Croatia
Sacramento Kings draft picks
Sacramento Kings executives
Sacramento Kings players
Serbian basketball executives and administrators
Serbian men's basketball players
Serbian expatriate basketball people in Canada
Serbian expatriate basketball people in the United States
Serbian expatriate basketball people in Greece
Serbs of Croatia
Small forwards
Toronto Raptors players
Yugoslav men's basketball players
Yugoslav Wars refugees